This article is about the particular significance of the year 1722 to Wales and its people.

Incumbents
Lord Lieutenant of North Wales (Lord Lieutenant of Anglesey, Caernarvonshire, Denbighshire, Flintshire, Merionethshire, Montgomeryshire) – Hugh Cholmondeley, 1st Earl of Cholmondeley 
Lord Lieutenant of Glamorgan – vacant until 1729
Lord Lieutenant of Brecknockshire and Lord Lieutenant of Monmouthshire – Sir William Morgan of Tredegar (from 7 March)
Lord Lieutenant of Cardiganshire – John Vaughan, 1st Viscount Lisburne (until 20 March); John Vaughan, 2nd Viscount Lisburne (from 21 March)
Lord Lieutenant of Carmarthenshire – vacant until 1755 
Lord Lieutenant of Pembrokeshire – Sir Arthur Owen, 3rd Baronet
Lord Lieutenant of Radnorshire – James Brydges, 1st Duke of Chandos (from 11 September)

Bishop of Bangor – Richard Reynolds
Bishop of Llandaff – John Tyler
Bishop of St Asaph – John Wynne
Bishop of St Davids – Adam Ottley

Events
February - Jane Brereton's husband Thomas drowns in the River Dee at Saltney; following his death, she returns to live in Wrexham.
9 May - At the conclusion of the general election, new MPs for Welsh constituencies include Sir William Owen, 4th Baronet (Pembroke Boroughs); Francis Edwardes (Haverfordwest) and Sir William Morgan for Brecon and Monmouthshire.
June - William Wotton returns to London, where he continues to work on his Leges Wallicae, a translation of the old laws of Wales.

Arts and literature

New books
Dwysfawr Rym Buchedd Grefyddol

Births
9 May - Morgan Edwards, Baptist historian (died 1795)
date unknown 
Thomas Crofts, priest, Fellow of the Royal Society, traveller and book-collector (died 1781) 
Rowland Jones, lawyer and philologist (died 1774) 
probable
James Relly, Methodist minister (died 1778)
Hugh Williams, clergyman and writer (died 1779)

Deaths
10 February - Bartholomew Roberts, pirate ("Black Bart"), 39 (in battle)
16 November - John Vaughan, reformer, 59
16 December - Abel Morgan, Baptist minister, pastor of Pennepack Baptist Church in Philadelphia, 49

References

1720s in Wales
Years of the 18th century in Wales